Otitoma tropispira is a species of sea snail, a marine gastropod mollusk in the family Pseudomelatomidae, the turrids and allies.

Description
The length of the shell varies between 14 mm and 19 mm.

Distribution
This marine species occurs off New Caledonia.

References

 Morassi M., Nappo A. & Bonfitto A. (2017). New species of the genus Otitoma Jousseaume, 1898 (Pseudomelatomidae, Conoidea) from the Western Pacific Ocean. European Journal of Taxonomy. 304: 1-30

External links
 Gastropods.com: Otitoma tropispira

tropispira
Gastropods described in 2017